This is a list of association football clubs in Saudi Arabia.

Saudi Arabia Football League 2015-2016 season

Saudi Professional League (14 team)

Saudi First Division (19 team)

Saudi Second Division (20 team)

Saudi Third Division (34 team)

 
Saudi Arabia
Football
Clubs